Mr & Mrs 420 is a Punjabi comedy film directed by Ksshitij Chaudhary and starring Yuvraj Hans, Jassi Gill, Babbal Rai, Binnu Dhillon and Jaswinder Bhalla in lead roles. It was released worldwide on 14 March 2014. A sequel titled Mr & Mrs 420 Returns was released on 15 August 2018.

The core storyline is partially based on the 1966 Hindi movie Biwi Aur Makan (which was based on the Bengali movie Joy Maa Kali Boarding) and which was an inspiration for the Marathi movie  Ashi Hi Banwa Banwi (1989), Telugu movie Chitram Bhalare Vichitram (1991), two Kannada movies - Bombat Hendthi(1992) and as Olu Saar Bari Olu (2003), Tamil movie Aanazhagan (1995), Bengali movie Jio Pagla (2017) and Hindi movie Paying Guests (2009).

Plot
Deputy (Binnu Dhillon) wants to be an actor like Dharmendra but has to settle for playing Surpanakha (character) in a local Ramlila because of the lack of opportunity. His friend Jass (Jassi Gill) is unemployed and in love with a young woman who will only marry if he finds a job. Their families feel humiliated because of them. They join their friend Palli (Yuvraj Hans) in a town for a better future and to prove themselves.

The big problem is that this cannot be done until they have a place to stay. Then comes Babbu (Babbal Rai), friend of Palli, to their rescue. It does not last long because of their parting one night. They have to look for another shelter. According to their budget, they are getting places that will only allow married couples to stay. So they lie about their marital status — somehow Palli and Jass convince Babu and Deputy to play their wives to get a roof over their heads.

Cast
 Binnu Dhillon as Deputy / Neeru Paali Chhada / Japji
 Yuvraj Hans as Paali Chhada
 Jassi Gill as Jass Chhada
 Babbal Rai as Babbu Kirtpuria / Pinky Jass Chhada
 Jaswinder Bhalla as Subedaar Kirpaal Singh Gill
 Avantika Hundal as Laadi
 Swati Kapoor as Raano (Pali's Love interest)
 Shruti Sodhi as Jasmeet Gill (Subedaar'niece)

Soundtrack

References

External links

2014 films
Punjabi-language Indian films
2010s Punjabi-language films
Punjabi remakes of Marathi films
Punjabi remakes of Hindi films
Cross-dressing in Indian films
Indian comedy films